Washington Mills is an unincorporated community in Dubuque County, Iowa, United States.

History
 Washington Mills' population was 75 in 1887, and was 112 in 1902.

References

Unincorporated communities in Dubuque County, Iowa
Unincorporated communities in Iowa